Mahant Digvijay Nath (born Nanhu Singh; 1894–1969) was the mahant, of the Gorakhnath Math in Gorakhpur, India. He was also a Hindu nationalist activist and a politician of the Hindu Mahasabha, who was arrested for inflaming passions among Hindus against Mahatma Gandhi. Nath played a leading role in the Ram Janmabhoomi movement in 1949, which culminated in the placing of Rama idols inside the Babri Masjid, in an effort to revive the Hindu Mahasabha after its implication in the Gandhi assassination. Nath was elected as the MP for Gorakhpur in 1967 on a Hindu Mahasabha ticket.

Early life 
Digvijay Nath was born Swaroop 'Nanhu' Singh in 1894 in Kankarwa Thikana (Mewar) of (Udaipur), Rajasthan in a Viramdevot Ranawat Rajput family. His mother (a Rathore from Kundoj, Ajmer) died when he was 8 years old. His father was Rawat Thakur Uday Singhji of Kankarwa, President of the Mewar Presidency Council (Mahendraj Sabha). He was given away or taken away to a Nathpanth yogi called Phul Nath, who took him to the Gorakhnath Math (monastery) in Gorakhpur. Nanhu Singh grew up in a monastery and went to study at St. Andrews College in Gorakhpur. He was an average student but excelled in sports, especially, hockey, horse-riding, and tennis. In 1920, he left his education to take part in politics.

In 1932, Baba Brahma Nath became the mahant of the Gorakhnath Math and initiated Nanhu Singh into the Nath Panth tradition.  After his death in 1935, the leadership of the math passed to Digvijay Nath, who was anointed as the mahant on 15 August 1935. Despite being a mahant, Nath continued his pastime of playing lawn tennis as well as his political activities.  The Gorakhnath math was traditionally venerated by both Hindus and Muslims, especially in lower caste communities.

Religious career
Digvijay Nath was succeeded by Mahant Avaidyanath as the head of Gorakhnath Math in 1969.

Political career 
Digvijay Nath joined the Congress in 1920, and participated in the non-cooperation movement in 1922. He was arrested for taking an "active part" in the Chauri Chaura incident where a police station was burnt down, killing 23 policemen, causing Mahatma Gandhi to abort the movement.

Nath joined the Hindu Mahasabha in 1937 when V. D. Savarkar became its President, and rose to become the head of the party in the United Provinces. His status as the mahant of the Gorakhpur Math as well as his political acumen helped him rise fast. He was radically anti-Muslim. He told The Statesman in 1952 that, if the Hindu Mahasabha attained power, it would deprive the Muslims of the right to vote for five to ten years, until they proved "their loyalty to India." He incited Hindus to kill Mahatma Gandhi in a public meeting on 27 January 1948, three days before the actual assassination. He was subsequently arrested, along with Professor Ram Singh and V. G. Deshpande, but released after 9 months.

Soon after his release from prison, Digvijay Nath started making plans to revive the Hindu Mahasabha, which had invited the public's revulsion for its role in the assassination of Gandhi. The capture of the Babri Masjid in Ayodhya was a key plank of his plan.

He was elected to Lok Sabha in 1967 General election from Gorakhpur. He died mid-term in 1969.

References

Citations

Sources 
 

1894 births
Bharatiya Janata Party politicians from Uttar Pradesh
People from Gorakhpur
Indian Hindus
Lok Sabha members from Uttar Pradesh
Ayodhya dispute
1969 deaths
Far-right politicians in India
Hindu Mahasabha politicians
India MPs 1967–1970